Yamil Silva (born 30 December 1996) is an Argentinian professional football player who plays as a midfielder for Argentine Primera División side Patronato.

Career
Silva was promoted into the first-team squad of Patronato in the 2016–17 Argentine Primera División season, serving as an unused substitute six times throughout the campaign. On 1 June 2017, Silva made his professional debut in the Copa Argentina against Deportivo Morón of Primera B Metropolitana.

Career statistics
.

References

External links

1996 births
Living people
People from Paraná, Entre Ríos
Argentine footballers
Association football midfielders
Argentine Primera División players
Club Atlético Patronato footballers
Sportspeople from Entre Ríos Province